The 1996 Ohio Bobcats football team was an American football team that represented Ohio University in the Mid-American Conference (MAC) during the 1996 NCAA Division I-A football season. In their second season under head coach Jim Grobe, the Bobcats compiled a 6–6 record (5–3 against MAC opponents), finished in fourth place in the MAC, and outscored all opponents by a combined total of 302 to 237.  They played their home games in Peden Stadium in Athens, Ohio.

Schedule

References

Ohio
Ohio Bobcats football seasons
Ohio Bobcats football